Temnostoma alternans  (Loew, 1864), the Wasp-like falsehorn, is a common species of syrphid fly observed throughout the northern and central United States and widespread in Canada. Hoverflies can remain nearly motionless in flight. The adults are also  known as flower flies for they are commonly found on flowers, from which they get both energy-giving nectar and protein-rich pollen. Larvae burrow in moist decayed wood.

Distribution
Canada, United States.

References

Eristalinae
Insects described in 1864
Diptera of North America
Taxa named by Hermann Loew